"1970" is a single by Japanese  band Boris released by Inoxia Records. It features alternate studio takes of two of the songs from Heavy Rocks. The single was limited to 500 copies on black vinyl, and is currently the only way to hear any of Heavy Rocks on the format.

Track listing 
 "1970 (Alternate Take)" - 4:49
 "Wareruraido (Alternate Take)" - 2:36

Pressing history

2002 singles
Boris (band) songs
2002 songs
Song articles with missing songwriters